The 2022 Premier Lacrosse League season was the fourth season of the Premier Lacrosse League (PLL). It was held from June 4 to September 18.

Player movement

College Draft
The 2022 Premier Lacrosse League college draft was held on May 10 and began at 8:00PM eastern time. The draft was the first PLL property to be broadcast on an ESPN network when it aired on ESPN U. There was a simulcast on ESPN+ as well. Chris Cotter, Ryan Boyle and Paul Carcaterra hosted the draft and analyzed the picks. This draft featured the first ever draft day trade between Atlas LC and Cannons LC. The University of Maryland set a record for the most players drafted in one draft with six. By virtue of having the worst record last season, Chrome LC held the number one overall pick.

Format:
Each team was awarded one pick in each of the four rounds. 
Eligible players must currently be in their senior year

Note: For athletes that went to multiple universities, the first university listed is the university the player finished their career with.

Tour Map

Schedule

Playoffs

Source:

Standings

Last updated: August 24, 2022

Source:

League leaders

Last Updated: September 21, 2022

Source:

References 

Premier Lacrosse League
Premier Lacrosse League
Lacrosse